The 1973 All-Big Ten Conference football team consists of American football players chosen by various organizations for All-Big Ten Conference teams for the 1973 Big Ten Conference football season.

Offensive selections

Quarterbacks
 Dennis Franklin, Michigan  (AP-1; UPI-1)
 Mitch Anderson, Northwestern (AP-2; UPI-2)

Running backs
 Archie Griffin, Ohio State (AP-1; UPI-1)
 Ed Shuttlesworth, Michigan (AP-1; UPI-1)
 Bill Marek, Wisconsin (AP-1; UPI-2)
 Gil Chapman, Michigan (UPI-2)
 Chuck Heater, Michigan (AP-2)
 Rick Upchurch, Minnesota (AP-2)
 Stan Key, Northwestern (AP-2)

Ends/receivers
 Steve Craig, Northwestern (AP-1 [end]; UPI-1 [tight end])
 Garvin Roberson, Illinois (UPI-1 [split end])
 Clint Haslerig, Michigan (UPI-1 [flanker])
 Brian Rollins, Iowa (AP-1 [end])
 Paul Seal, Michigan (AP-2 [end]; UPI-2 [tight end])
 Trent Smock, Indiana (AP-2 [end])
 Jeff Mack, Wisconsin (UPI-2 [split end])
 Brian Baschnagel, Ohio State (UPI-2 [flanker])

Tackles
 John Hicks, Ohio State (AP-1; UPI-1)
 Kurt Schumacher, Ohio State (UPI-1)
 Keith Fahnhorst, Minnesota (AP-1)
 Jim Coode, Michigan (AP-2; UPI-2)
 Dennis Lick, Wisconsin (AP-2; UPI-2)

Guards
 Mike Hoban, Michigan (AP-1; UPI-1)
 Jim Kregel, Ohio State (AP-1; UPI-1)
 Gary Hainrihar, Michigan (UPI-2)
 Ralph Perretta, Purdue (UPI-2)
 Darrell Bunge, Minnesota (AP-2)
 Revie Sorey, Illinois (AP-2)

Centers
 Mike Webster, Wisconsin (AP-1; UPI-1)
 Steven Myers, Ohio State (AP-2; UPI-2)

Defensive selections

Defensive linemen
 Van DeCree, Ohio State (AP-1 [front 5]; UPI-1 [def. end])
 Steve Neils, Minnesota (AP-1 [front 5]; UPI-1 [def. end])
 Pete Cusick, Ohio State (AP-1 [front 5]; UPI-1 [def. tackle])
 Dave Gallagher, Michigan (AP-1 [front 5]; UPI-1 [def. tackle])
 Vic Koegel, Ohio State (UPI-1 [guard])
 Octavus Morgan, Illinois (AP-1 [front 5])
 John Shinsky, Michigan State (AP-2 [front 5]; UPI-2 [def. tackle])
 Carl Barzilauskas, Indiana (AP-2 [front 5])
 Jim Schymanski, Wisconsin (AP-2 [front 5])
 Steve Strinko, Michigan (AP-2 [front 5])
 Walt Williamson, Michigan (AP-2 [front 5])
 Don Coleman, Michigan (UPI-2 [def. end])
 Jim Cope, Ohio State (UPI-2 [def. end])
 Donald R. Warner, Michigan (UPI-2 [guard])

Linebackers
 Randy Gradishar, Ohio State (AP-1; UPI-1)
 Rick Middleton, Ohio State (AP-1; UPI-1)
 Mike Varty, Northwestern (AP-1; UPI-2)
 Mark Gefert, Purdue (AP-2)
 Tom Hicks, Illinois (AP-2)
 Ray Nester, Michigan State (AP-2)
 Terence McClowry, Michigan State (UPI-2)

Defensive backs
 Dave Brown, Michigan (AP-1; UPI-1)
 Neal Colzie, Ohio State (AP-1; UPI-1)
 Mike Gow, Illinois (AP-1; UPI-1)
 Bill Simpson, Michigan State (AP-2; UPI-1)
 Earl Douthitt, Iowa (AP-2; UPI-2)
 Tim Racke, Purdue (AP-2)
 Steve Luke, Ohio State (UPI-2)
 Mark Niesen, Michigan State (UPI-2)
 Quinn Buckner, Indiana (UPI-2)

Key
AP = Associated Press

UPI = United Press International, selected by the conference coaches

Bold = Consensus first-team selection of both AP and UPI

See also
1973 College Football All-America Team

References

All-Big Ten Conference
All-Big Ten Conference football teams